Tetrathylacium is a genus of two species of shrubs and small trees in the family Salicaceae native to the southern Central America and northern South America. Previously it was treated in the family Flacourtiaceae but was moved along with its close relatives to the Salicaceae based on analyses of DNA data. Tetrathylacium is rather unique in the Samydaceae in having tightly arranged panicles of spikes, four sepals and stamens, and non-arillate seeds. The stems are often inhabited by ants, and T. macrophyllum is suspected to have locust pollination.

References 

Salicaceae
Flora of South America
Malpighiales genera
Taxa named by Eduard Friedrich Poeppig